Jilavele is a commune located in Ialomița County, Muntenia, Romania. It is composed of two villages, Jilavele and Slătioarele.

The commune is located in the northwestern corner of the county, bordering on both Prahova County and Buzău County.

References

Communes in Ialomița County
Localities in Muntenia